Dr. Harry Marc Rowe  (1861–1926) was an American businessman in Baltimore, Maryland.

Rowe's career started in teaching. He advanced to become the president of Curry College in Pittsburgh. He left to become an early practicing accountant. In 1897 he became president of Eastern Commercial Teachers' Association. Rowe and Warren Sadler started a business in Baltimore publishing a practical accounting text in workbook format. The Sadler-Rowe Company was under Rowe's control in 1907, and renamed to the H.M. Rowe Company in 1911.

Rowe operated the De Kol Farm dairy outside of Baltimore. He also owned a large frame house on Johnnycake Road in Catonsville, that burned down on March 23, 1912, but was well insured. Shortly afterward in 1913, Rowe constructed a $20,000 mausoleum in Woodlawn Cemetery.

Rowe was an executive of the American Automobile Association, becoming its president from 1916 to 1918 promoting road construction to Congress.

Rowe partnered with A.T. Carozza on lucrative road building  and public works contracts in Maryland, forming Carozza-Rowe Construction. In 1926, Carozza mortgaged his Ingleside estate to Rowe and again to Addison E. Mullikin. The same year, Rowe's son killed his father with a crowbar, stabbed his sister, pushed his mother into a fire, and was found dead in the Severn River soon afterward.

References 

American businesspeople
1861 births
1926 deaths
People from Catonsville, Maryland